Burston railway station was on the  to  line and served the village of Burston, Norfolk. Only the station building remains; the signal box has been removed and very little evidence of the platforms or sidings exist. A cottage between the railway line and the station master's house was also demolished.

The railway line still passes through it on a level crossing.

Former services

References 

Disused railway stations in Norfolk
Former Great Eastern Railway stations
Railway stations in Great Britain opened in 1849
Railway stations in Great Britain closed in 1966